Lars Elinderson, born in 1949, is a Swedish politician of the Moderate Party. He was a member of the Riksdag (Parliament) in 1998–2002, and 2006–2014. He also served as a replacement member of the Riksdag in 2004. Before serving in the Parliament, Elinderson was a County Council Commissioner in Skaraborg County Council 1982-1991 and the Mayor of Falköping municipality from 1991 to 1998. Elinderson is an economist by profession, and holds master's degrees in Finance and Economic history.

References

Riksdagen: Lars Elinderson (m)

Members of the Riksdag from the Moderate Party
Living people
1949 births